Anton Träg (11 June 1819 – 7 July 1860) was an Austrian cellist and composer.

Life
Träg was born in Schwechat, and studied with Joseph Merk at the Conservatory of the Gesellschaft der Musikfreunde in Vienna. He was a teacher at Prague Conservatory from 1845 to 1852. He appeared in Prague as a soloist, and in chamber ensembles with Johann Král, Bedřich Smetana,  and others.

He died in 1860, leaving a wife and son.

Träg was said to have an accomplished, clean technique, with which he combined a soulful delivery and a remarkable large pithy tone.

Compositions
He wrote several works for cello, and a Concertino for cello and orchestra.

References

1819 births
1860 deaths
19th-century Austrian people
Austrian classical cellists
Austrian classical composers
People from Schwechat